Çırağan Palace, a former Ottoman palace, is now a five-star hotel in the Kempinski Hotels chain. It is located on the European shore of the Bosporus, between Beşiktaş and Ortaköy in Istanbul, Turkey.

History 
The palace, built by Sultan Abdulaziz to replace the old Çırağan Palace which was at the same location, was designed by the Armenian palace architect Nigoğayos Balyan and constructed by his sons Sarkis and Hagop Balyan between 1863 and 1867, during a period in which all Ottoman sultans built their own palaces rather than using those of their ancestors; Çırağan Palace is the last example of this tradition. The inner walls and the roof were made of wood, the outer walls of colorful marble. A beautiful marble bridge connects the palace to the Yıldız Palace on the hill behind. A very high garden wall protects the palace from the outer world.

The construction and the interior decoration of the palace continued until 1872. Sultan Abdulaziz did not live long in his magnificent palace - he was found dead inside on 30 May 1876, shortly after he was dethroned. His successor, his nephew Sultan Murad V, moved into Çırağan Palace, but reigned for only 93 days. He was deposed by his brother Abdul Hamid II due to alleged mental illness and lived there under house arrest until his death on 29 August 1904

On November 14, 1909, during the Second Constitutional Monarchy, Sultan Mehmed V allowed the Ottoman Parliament to hold their meetings in this building. Only two months later, on January 19, 1910, a great fire destroyed the palace, leaving only the outer walls intact. Called "Şeref Stadı", for many years its garden served as a football field for the club Beşiktaş J.K.

In 1987, the ruined palace was bought by a Japanese corporation, which restored the palace and added a modern hotel complex next to it in its garden. The modern hotel building was opened in 1990 and the restored palace building was opened in 1992. Today, it serves as luxury suites for the five-star Kempinski hotel along with two restaurants that cater to guests.

The Palace was renovated again during the first quarter of 2007, now resembling the authentic palace with the baroque style and soft colors.

See also 
 Hotels in Istanbul
 Ottoman architecture

References 

 History of the palace

Literature 
 Çelik Gülersoy. The Çerâğan palaces. Istanbul Kitaplığı, Istanbul (1992).

External links 

 Çırağan Palace
 Çırağan Palace Suites

Garabet Amira Balyan buildings
Sarkis Balyan buildings
Ottoman palaces in Istanbul
Houses completed in 1867
Redevelopment projects in Istanbul
Hotels established in 1991
Bosphorus
Hotels in Istanbul
Kempinski Hotels
Beşiktaş
Tourism in Istanbul
1991 establishments in Turkey
19th-century architecture in Turkey